Togou is a village and rural commune in the Cercle of Ségou in the Ségou Region of southern-central Mali. The commune contains 10 villages in an area of approximate 147 square kilometers. In the 2009 census it had a population of 8,987. The village of Togou, the chef-lieu of the commune, is 35 km northeast of Ségou.

References

External links
.
.

Communes of Ségou Region